Joan Stevenson (Judy) Abbott  (11 December 1899 – 27 November 1975) was an Australian World War II army hospital matron.

Early life and education 
Abbott was born on 11 December 1899 in Brisbane. She undertook her basic nursing training at Brisbane General Hospital from 1920 to 1923, and later passed her midwifery certificate at Lady Bowen Hospital in April 1926. She was appointed a baby clinic nurse, on probation, the following month and completed her child welfare certificate in June 1926.

Career 

On 8 August 1940 Abbott was appointed for service with the AIF medical division as a matron of a unit of Queensland nurses.

In the Middle East Abbott was in charge of a 1200-bed Australian Base Hospital. She returned to Australia in 1943 and in April was appointed principal matron of the Queensland Lines of Communication Area.

In June 1946 Abbott was awarded a Florence Nightingale Foundation scholarship and undertook two years' postgraduate study in London.

Abbott retired from her position of principal matron, Northern Command on 11 December 1954, having reached the compulsory retirement age of 55.

Awards and honors 

On 18 February 1943, Abbott received the Royal Red Cross (1st Class) for "service to the Australian Army Nursing Service".

On 1 June 1953 Abbott received the Coronation Medal.

Abbott was awarded the Florence Nightingale Medal in 1957.

Death and legacy 
Abbott fractured her spine in 1975 and became paraplegic. She died on 27 November 1975 in Bethesda Hospital Corinda, Queensland. Her body was left to the anatomy department at the University of Queensland.

References 

1899 births
1975 deaths
Members of the Royal Red Cross
Florence Nightingale Medal recipients
Australian Army personnel of World War II
Female wartime nurses
Women in the Australian military
World War II nurses
Created via preloaddraft
20th-century Australian women